SAPO Codebits, also known simply as Codebits, was a (computing) conference held in Lisbon from 2007 to 2014. It was organized by SAPO which, besides a news media brand, was also an internet-focused R&D division of Portugal Telecom at the time. Initially inspired by Yahoo! Hack Day, the event lasted for three non-stop days, with many participants choosing to eat and sleep on site. Its core was a 48-hour hackathon but it also included dozens of talks during the day, as well as several entertainment activities in the evenings. Over the years, the number of talks and entertainment activities increased steadily, making it a reference in Portuguese hacker culture and attracting an increasing number of international attendees and speakers. Codebits was free for all participants, including food and drinks, and had little commercial undertones apart from product announcements in the opening keynote. Active recruiting inside the premises was also disallowed. The number of seats was limited, so potential attendees had to apply for a ticket and undergo a screening process.

In 2015, Portugal Telecom was acquired by Altice, SAPO's mission changed, and Codebits was discontinued. In 2016, the event format was revived by another team of organizers under the name Pixels Camp.

Format 

The event took place over three consecutive days (and nights), starting on a Thursday. The first morning was composed of general keynotes from the organizing company and its partners/sponsors, plus general information about the hackathon and satellite activities. The hackathon started in the afternoon, along with multiple tracks of talks in parallel, and lasted until Saturday morning, with Saturday afternoon reserved for project presentations, voting, and closing ceremony.

48-hour Hackathon 

In the hackathon, teams were free to propose whatever project they wanted, software or hardware, with no themes or subject restrictions. On Saturday, teams were required to present their projects on stage. They had 90 seconds to do it and the audience voted (thumbs up/down) between each presentation. The selection of winning teams was a combination of the audience votes and the votes of a jury panel. The weighting between the audience and jury votes varied from edition to edition.

Talks 
Talks were mostly self-proposed by participants, but there were also a number of talks from invited speakers. Self-proposed talks followed a public process where all proposals were visible to everyone for comments and suggestions, but the final selection was made by the organizers.

Evening Activities 
Satellite activities were usually held in the evenings. These activities usually combined entertainment with some element of geek culture and were initially meant to provide some relief from the hackathon, but gained a life of their own over time. Some of the most prominent activities are:

Quiz Show 
Since 2008, in the four weeks before the event, participants had to solve about one challenge per-week to qualify for the quiz show. The challenges included image enigmas, treasure hunts, code golf contests, among others. They all shared a reasonably high level of difficulty and required a fair knowledge of tech-related culture and motivation. Qualified participants then went on stage on Friday night for a few rounds of questions, mostly about science, technology, and geek trivia.

Security CTF 
The security competition followed a capture-the-flag (CTF) model where participants must answer questions and solve challenges related to cyber-security (such as identifying and exploiting vulnerable applications purposely built for the competition) in order to obtain a tokens (flags) that translate into points. The competition took place on Thursday night over three hours. Like the quiz show, participants had to qualify by solving a few challenges in the weeks before the event.

Nuclear Tacos 
The "nuclear" tacos competition involved eating ultra-spicy tacos as fast as possible over a few rounds of increasing spiciness. It started in 2010 as a dare to participants but eventually evolved into a competition. It usually took place on Friday before the quiz show.

Other activities included a Presentation Karaoke, retro-gaming, and workshops on soldering, 3D printing, lockpicking, etc. In some editions there were also music concerts (e.g. WrayGunn in 2007, Pornophonique in 2009).

Attendee selection 
Those wanting to attend the event had to apply to attend. Applicants who did not work with technology directly, such as those in marketing and recruiting, were usually rejected. Attendees included developers, systems administrators, web designers, etc.

Editions 
 2007 — November 13–15 at Gare Marítima de Alcântara, Lisbon — 400 attendees
 2008 — November 13–15 at LX Factory, Lisbon — 500 attendees
 2009 — December 3–5 at Cordoaria Nacional, Lisbon — 600 attendees
 2010 — November 11–13 at Pavilhão Atlântico, Lisbon — 700 attendees
 2011 — November 10–12 at Pavilhão Atlântico, Lisbon — 800 attendees
 2012 — November 16–18 at Pavilhão Atlântico, Lisbon — 800 attendees
 2014 — April 10–12 at MEO Arena, Lisbon — 900 attendees

In 2013, Codebits was planned to happen simultaneously in São Paulo and Lisbon delaying both events due to logistics issues at the Brazilian venue — which, meanwhile, was hit by fire forcing a Lisbon-only event in April 2014.

Reboot: Pixels Camp 

In 2016, a team composed mostly of SAPO ex-employees rebooted the event under the name Pixels Camp while keeping the format more or less the same. Pixels Camp has had three editions so far, with the fourth edition having been canceled in 2020 due to the COVID-19 pandemic. These editions were organized by Bright Pixel (a startup incubator and accelerator) but future editions, if any, are planned to be organized independently with a financing model still to be defined.

Pixels Camp Editions 
 2016 — October 6–8 at LX Factory, Lisbon — 1000 attendees
 2017 — September 28–30 at Pavilhão Carlos Lopes, Lisbon — 1200 attendees
 2019 — March 21–23 at Pavilhão Carlos Lopes, Lisbon — 1300 attendees

References

External links 
 Codebits official website at the Internet Archive.
 Codebits videos on SAPO Vídeos.
 Pixels Camp official website.
 Pixels Camp videos on YouTube.

Hacker culture
Programming contests
Hackathons
Conferences
Annual events in Portugal
Recurring events established in 2007
2007 establishments in Portugal